The film career of Judy Davis spans over four decades and includes credits in both film and television. Davis first garnered acclaim for her performance in the period drama My Brilliant Career (1979), which earned her two BAFTA Awards. She garnered international attention for her performance in A Passage to India (1984), for which she was nominated for the Academy Award for Best Actress.

In 1990, Davis appeared in Alice, directed by Woody Allen, followed by a supporting role in David Cronenberg's Naked Lunch, as well as Joel Coen's Barton Fink (both 1991). She subsequently starred in Allen's drama Husbands and Wives (1992), which saw her nominated for the Academy Award and Golden Globe Award for Best Supporting Actress, as well as a BAFTA for Best Actress. She subsequently co-starred with Glenn Close in the television drama film Serving in Silence: The Margarethe Cammermeyer Story (1995) before reuniting with Allen to appear in Deconstructing Harry (1997) and Celebrity (1998).

Davis starred as Lillian Hellman in the Kathy Bates-directed television film Dash and Lilly (1999), followed by Life with Judy Garland: Me and My Shadows (2001), a critically acclaimed miniseries in which she portrayed Judy Garland. She again portrayed another real-life character, Nancy Reagan, in the television film The Reagans (2003). Subsequent film roles include the romantic comedy The Break-Up (2006), Sofia Coppola's Marie Antoinette (2006), and The Dressmaker. In 2017, Davis co-starred with Jessica Lange and Susan Sarandon on the network series Feud, in which she portrayed journalist Hedda Hopper.

Film

Television

References

Sources

External links
 at IMDb

Actress filmographies
Australian filmographies